Kaplan Financial Ltd is a British company providing training in accountancy and financial services. It was founded in 1958. Kaplan Financial is part of Kaplan, Inc., a subsidiary of Graham Holdings Company. Kaplan Financial has more than 48,000 students a year, both in the UK and overseas. It offers courses in 28 training centres throughout the UK as well as home study and online learning.

Kaplan Financial prepares students for professional accountancy and tax exams including the AAT, ACA, ACCA, and CIMA, and investment qualifications such as CFA, CAIA, FRM, IAQ, IMC and SII. Kaplan Financial also offers a range of postgraduate courses including MBA, MA and MSc, as well as management and personnel qualifications.

History
 Kaplan Financial was formerly known as the Financial Training Company, then as FTC Kaplan after its acquisition in February 2003 by Kaplan, Inc., a global provider of education and training services. FTC also produced exam-focussed study materials, test prep and courses for the American Academy of Financial Management, AAT, ACCA and CIMA that were also used widely in other training institutions in the public and private sectors. These materials are now produced by Kaplan Publishing, another company in the Kaplan group.

Acquisitions
Major acquisitions in the last decade include:

2003—UK Accountancy Tuition Centres Ltd (ATC), provider of accountancy and professional training in the UK
2003—Emile Woolf Colleges Ltd., provider of CIMA and ACCA training
2003—AT Foulks Lynch Ltd., publisher of accountancy training materials for ACCA, CIMA, AAT and CAT syllabi
2003—Portman College of Management, a Newcastle-based professional school offering management training programmes
2008—Hawksmere Limited, a London-based training and conference provider
2009—West of England Language Services Limited (WELS), an international group of English language schools located in the United States, Australia, and the UK

Awards
In July 2009 Kaplan Financial was the first ACCA distance learning provider to be awarded Platinum status by the ACCA (Association of Chartered Certified Accountants). This is the highest status awarded to a tuition provider.

Knowledge Bank
In November 2012, Kaplan Financial launched the Kaplan Financial Knowledge Bank, a reference site providing free access to accountancy information.

Training Locations 
As of 2018, Kaplan Financial has 23 training centres located up and down the UK as well as Distance Learning, Live Online, OnDemand products. These are:
 Birmingham
 Bristol
 Cambridge,
 Cardiff - ICAEW Courses only
 Crawley - ICAEW Courses only
 Glasgow
 Grimsby
 Hull
 Ipswich
 Isle of Man
 Leeds
 Leicester
 Liverpool
 London Borough High Street
 London Islington
 Manchester
 Milton Keynes
 Newcastle
 Norwich
 Nottingham
 Reading
 Sheffield
 Southampton

References

External links
Kaplan Financial Ltd. official website
Kaplan, Inc. official website
Kaplan Apprenticeships website
Kaplan Financial Knowledge Bank website

Education companies established in 1958
British companies established in 1958
Companies based in the London Borough of Southwark
Training companies of the United Kingdom
1958 establishments in England